Western line may refer to:

 Western Line (Mumbai Suburban Railway), of the Mumbai Suburban Railway in Mumbai, India
 Western Line, Taiwan, a railway line through Taiwan
 Western Line (Auckland), a railway line in Auckland, New Zealand
 Linha do Oeste, a railway line connecting Lisbon to Figueira da Foz, in Portugal

Australia
 Main Western railway line, New South Wales - railway line in Western Sydney & Western NSW
 North Shore & Western Line - passenger rail service in Sydney
 Western standard gauge line, Victoria,  part of the Melbourne–Adelaide railway
 Western railway line, Queensland
 Western Line, Tasmania

See also
 West Line (disambiguation)